A Pierrot ensemble is a musical ensemble comprising flute, clarinet, violin, cello and piano. This ensemble is named after 20th-century composer Arnold Schoenberg’s seminal work Pierrot Lunaire, which includes the quintet of instruments above with a narrator (usually performed by a soprano).

History
The quintet of instruments used in Pierrot Lunaire has been used in the twentieth century by different groups, such as The Fires of London, who formed in 1965 as "The Pierrot Players" to perform Pierrot Lunaire, and continued to concertize with a varied classical and contemporary repertory.  This group began to perform works arranged for these instruments and commission new works.

While standard chamber ensembles (such as string quartets or piano trios) continued to be extremely popular among 20th-century composers, the Pierrot ensemble represents an example of the many kinds of non-standard chamber ensembles that have been used in classical music since the beginning of the 20th century.

The number of compositions written for Pierrot Ensemble is limited by the inherent unbalance of the ensemble (two strings, plus two winds, plus piano). More frequent are works that introduce additional instruments, typically more strings, and especially percussion which obtains a small, and inexpensive, chamber ensemble with three families of instruments represented.

Doublings
Doublings are a standard compositional device used to extend an ensemble instrumental color.  In Schoenberg's Pierrot Lunaire, the flutist is asked to play piccolo, the clarinetist is asked to play bass clarinet.  Other common doublings might include E clarinet (as in Carter's Triple Duo), alto flute.

Notable Pierrot ensembles

Fires of London (Founded as the Pierrot Players) (1965-1987, UK)
Da Capo Chamber Players (1970, USA)
The New Music Players (1990, UK)
Standing Wave (1991, Canada)
Brightwork New Music (2013, USA)
What Is Noise (2014, USA)
Ensemble Namu 나무앙상블 (2017, South Korea)

Works for Pierrot ensemble
 Arnold Schoenberg: Pierrot Lunaire (1912) + voice (usually soprano)
 The originary work after which the ensemble is named.

 Amaury du Closel: Stolpersteine (2021)
 John Harbison:
 Die Kürze (1970)
 Chaconne (2001)
 Milton Babbitt: Arie da Capo (1979) 
 Ellen Taaffe Zwilich: Intrada (1983)
 Gérard Grisey: Taléa (1986)
 Zhou Long: Dhyana (1989)
 Steven Mackey: Indigenous Instruments (1989)
 Gunther Schuller: Paradigm Exchanges (1991)
 Jorge Villavicencio Grossmann:
 Siray I (1995)
 Siray III (2018)
 Michael Torke: Telephone Book (1995) {comprising Yellow Pages (1985), Blue Pages (1995), and White Pages (1995)}
 Dorothy Hindman: Setting Century (1999)
 David Lang: Sweet Air (1999)
 Carolyn Yarnell: Lapis Lazuli (2007)
 Jean-Louis Agobet: Eclisses (2008)
 Fabien Levy: A propos (2008)
 Greg Caffrey: These are the Clouds about the fallen sun (2013)
 Caio Facó: Sopros do Estuário (2017)

Works with alternative/additional instruments

 Maurice Ravel: 3 Poèmes de Stéphane Mallarmé (1913) + 2nd flute, 2nd clarinet, and voice
 Igor Stravinsky: 3 Japanese Lyrics (1913) + 2nd flute doubling piccolo, 2nd clarinet, and voice
 Hanns Eisler:
Palmström (1926) + soprano (without piano)
14 Arten den Regen zu beschreiben (1941) + viola
 Olivier Messiaen: Quatuor pour la fin du temps (1941) (without flute)
 Juan Carlos Paz: Dedalus (1950)
 Peter Maxwell Davies: Eight Songs for a Mad King (1969) + baritone and percussion
 Donald Martino: Notturno (1973) + percussion; winner of the 1974 Pulitzer Prize
 Morton Feldman: For Frank O'Hara (1976) + percussion
 Ralph Shapey: Three for Six (1979) + percussion
 Joan Tower: Noon Dance (1982) + percussion
 Charles Wuorinen: New York Notes (1982) + 1 or 2 percussionists and electronic sounds
 Elliott Carter: Triple Duo (1983) + percussion
 Salvatore Sciarrino: Lo Spazio inverso (1985) + celesta
 John Harbison: The Natural World (1987) + soprano
 William Susman:
 Twisted Figures (1987) + mallet percussion
 Camille (2010) with piano four-hands
 John Cage: Seven (1988) + viola
 Kamran Ince: Waves of Talya (1989) + percussion
 Earle Brown: Tracking Pierrot (1992) + percussion
 Jacob Druckman: Come Round (1992) + percussion
 Laura Schwendinger: 
 Fable (1992) + percussion
 Songs of Heaven and Earth (1997)  + percussion, harp and voice
 Mise-en-scene (2011)  + percussion
 Artist's Muse (2017)  + percussion
 Chen Yi: Sparkle (1992) + 2 percussionists, double bass
 Iannis Xenakis: Plektó (1993) + percussion
 Mario Davidovsky: Flashbacks (1995) + percussion
 Gérard Grisey: Vortex Temporum (1996) + viola
 Robert Paterson:
 Quintus (1996) + percussion (without flute)
 Sextet (1999) + percussion
 The Thin Ice of Your Fragile Mind (2004) + percussion
 Eating Variations (2006) + baritone and percussion (without piano)
 Winter Songs (2008) + bass-baritone and percussion
 Hell's Kitchen (2014) + percussion
 Summer Songs (2016) + soprano and percussion
 Spring Songs (2018) + tenor and percussion
 Autumn Songs (2019) + mezzo-soprano and percussion
 Listen (2022) + choir and percussion
 Mel Powell: Sextet (1996) + percussion
 Lior Navok
 Sextet (1998) + percussion
 Elegy to the Future (2001) + percussion
 Steven Stucky: Ad Parnassum (1998) + percussion
 Steven Mackey: Micro-Concerto (1999) + percussion
 Fred Lerdahl: Time After Time (2000) + percussion
 Rytis Mazulis: Canon mensurabilis (2000) + viola
 Tristan Murail: Winter Fragments (2000) + electronic sounds
 Frederic Rzewski:
 Pocket Symphony (2000) + percussion 
 Brussels Diary (2010)
 George Perle: Critical Moments 2 (2001) + percussion
 Martin Bresnick: My Twentieth Century (2002) + viola
 Zhou Long:Five Elements (2002) + percussion; also exists in a version with Chinese instruments
 Sebastian Currier: Static (2003); winner of the 2007 Grawemeyer Award
 Jennifer Higdon: Zaka (2003) + percussion
 Theo Verbey: Perplex (2004) + vibraphone
 Rolf Wallin: The Age of Wire and String (2005)
 Stuart Greenbaum: Book of Departures (2007) + percussion
 Stephen Hartke: Meanwhile: Incidental Music to Imaginary Puppet Plays (2007) + viola (rather than violin) and percussion
 Steve Reich: Double Sextet (2007) for Pierrot ensemble with tape or 12 players; winner of the 2009 Pulitzer Prize
 John Woolrich In the Mirrors of Asleep (2007)
 Mohammed Fairouz: Unwritten (2010) + soprano
 Michael Seltenreich: Sparks & Flares (2010) + percussion
 Greg Caffrey:
 The Garden of Earthly Delights (2016) + percussion
 Three movements on the work of William Scott (2017) + percussion
 Things fall apart; the centre cannot hold (2018) + percussion
 Graham Waterhouse: Irish Phoenix (2017) + soprano

Notes

References
Christopher Dromey, The Pierrot Ensembles: Chronicle and Catalogue, 1912-2012 (London: Plumbago, 2013).

External links
From the Arnold Schoenberg Center
Pierrot Lunaire: autograph manuscript
Pierrot Lunaire: complete recording
Pierrot Lunaire Ensemble Wien
Art of the States: Pierrot ensemble American works for Pierrot ensemble
Barbara White
Pas mon ami Pierrot Blog post by American composer Kyle Gann on the Pierrot Ensemble

Chamber music groups
Types of musical groups